Opisthius is a genus of ground beetles in the family Carabidae. This genus has a single species, Opisthius richardsoni.

References

Nebriinae
Monotypic Carabidae genera